Yana Bland or Yana Bland Mintoff ( Yana Joan Mintoff) is a Maltese Labour politician, economist and educator. Mintoff was born on 21 August 1951, the daughter of the former Prime Minister of Malta, Dom Mintoff and Moyra De Vere Bentinck, by whom she is descended from both Dutch and British nobility.

Career
As a teacher in the United Kingdom, Yana Mintoff was a member of the Socialist Workers Party. On 6 July 1978 Mintoff took part in a demonstration in the UK House of Commons; in a protest against the presence of UK troops in Northern Ireland, three bags of horse manure were hurled from the public gallery during a debate on Scottish devolution;  John Mcsherry and Mintoff were arrested and she was later fined.

On her return to Malta, she helped establish the Association of Women of the Mediterranean Region. Mintoff helped compile four books of collected works:
Militarism in the Mediterranean, Malta 1994
Health in the Mediterranean, including interviews with Tuareg Nuclear test Victims, Malta 1995
Nobody Can Imagine Our Longing: Refugees and Immigrants in the Mediterranean, Plain View Press, Austin TX 1996
In Search of Peace, Plain View Press, 1998
An economist by training, her publications include an article published in the International Journal of Health Services, Johns Hopkins University, MD, USA.

In Texas in 1998,  Mintoff was a founder and superintendent of the Katherine Anne Porter School, a charter school in Wimberley.

Having returned to Malta to tend to her ailing father, Mintoff addressed the Maltese Labour Party's General Conference of 2012. She was a candidate in the 2013 Maltese general election, but failed to get elected to the House of Representatives.

Family
Mintoff's first husband was Geoff Mainwaring. She married David P. Bland in 1991. Her children are Cetta S. Mainwaring and Daniel X. Mainwaring.

After the couple separated, Mintoff formed a relationship with a younger man from Romania, Gheorghe Popa. On 24 October 2016, Popa became suspicious that she may have been dating another man, which led to a fight involving knives at the family residence in Tarxien. Her son, Daniel Mainwaring, intervened to stop the fight from escalating. As Mintoff and her son went to seek medical attention, Popa allegedly set the house on fire which lead to severe structural damage to the property. The 39-year-old Romanian was found in the vicinity after a man hunt, soaked in blood.

References

Living people
1951 births
Maltese women activists
Maltese educators
Maltese environmentalists
Maltese women environmentalists
Maltese emigrants to the United States
People from Hays County, Texas
Alumni of the University of Exeter
Bentinck family
Beauclerk family
Socialist Workers Party (UK) members